Surzyki Wielkie  (German Groß Sauerken) is a village in the administrative district of Gmina Małdyty, within Ostróda County, Warmian-Masurian Voivodeship, in northern Poland.

As of 2008, the village had a population of 50.

References

Surzyki Wielkie